Thiomonas is a genus of Gram-negative, non-spore-forming bacteria from the family of Comamonadaceae.

References

Comamonadaceae
Bacteria genera